Thomas Robinson, 2nd Baron Grantham PC (30 November 173820 July 1786) was a British statesman. He notably served as Foreign Secretary between 1782 and 1783.

Background and education
Grantham was born in Vienna, Austria, the son of Thomas Robinson, 1st Baron Grantham, British Ambassador to Austria at the time, by his wife Frances, daughter of Thomas Worsley. He was educated at Westminster School and at Christ's College, Cambridge.

Political career
Grantham entered parliament as member for Christchurch in 1761, and succeeded to the peerage, because of his father's death, in 1770. That year he was appointed to the Privy Council. In 1771 he was sent as  British Ambassador to Spain and retained this post until war broke out between Great Britain and Spain in 1779. In 1772, while at the Summer Spanish Court in Aranjuez, he received correspondence from Richard Wall, the Spanish Minister of Foreign Affairs. From 1780 to 1782 Grantham was President of the Board of Trade, and from July 1782 to April 1783 Foreign Secretary under Lord Shelburne.

Marriage and progeny

In 1780 Lord Grantham married Lady Mary Yorke (1757–1830), younger daughter of Philip Yorke, 2nd Earl of Hardwicke by his wife Lady Jemima Campbell (1723–1797), suo jure 2nd Marchioness Grey, a daughter of John Campbell, 3rd Earl of Breadalbane and Holland by his wife Lady Amabel Grey, a daughter of Henry Grey, 1st Duke of Kent (1671–1740).

In 1740 Lord Grantham's mother-in-law Lady Jemima Campbell (1723–1797) succeeded as 2nd Marchioness Grey by a special remainder upon the death of her maternal grandfather Henry Grey, 1st Duke of Kent, 1st Marquess Grey, 3rd Baron Lucas. As she had no male heirs, the title later became extinct upon her own death in 1797, but in 1816 her elder daughter Lady Amabel Yorke (1750–1833) (wife of Alexander Hume-Campbell, Lord Polwarth) was created  Countess de Grey in her own right.

Lord Grantham and his wife lived at Grantham House in Whitehall Yard, Westminster. By his wife  had two sons:
Thomas de Grey, 2nd Earl de Grey, eldest son and heir. He was born as Thomas Philip Robinson, his surname was Weddell from 1803 and de Grey from 1833.
Frederick John Robinson, 1st Viscount Goderich, 1st Earl of Ripon  (1782–1859), Prime Minister of the United Kingdom in 1827 and 1828.

Death
He died on 20 July 1786, aged only 46, and was succeeded in the barony by his eldest son, Thomas de Grey, 2nd Earl de Grey. His widow continued to live at Grantham House until her own death in January 1830, aged 72 years.

See also
 Wrest Park

References

External links

1738 births
1786 deaths
Politicians from Vienna
Alumni of Christ's College, Cambridge
Barons in the Peerage of Great Britain
British MPs 1761–1768
British MPs 1768–1774
British Secretaries of State for Foreign Affairs
Diplomatic peers
Members of the Privy Council of Great Britain
Robinson, Thomas
People educated at Westminster School, London
Ambassadors of Great Britain to Spain
Thomas
Parents of prime ministers of the United Kingdom
Presidents of the Board of Trade